Tim Hagans (born August 19, 1954) is an American jazz trumpeter, arranger, and composer. He has been nominated for three Grammy Awards: Best Instrumental Composition for "Box of Cannoli" on The Avatar Sessions (Fuzzy Music, 2010); Best Contemporary Jazz Album for Animation*Imagination (Blue Note, 1999); and Best Contemporary Jazz Album for Re-Animation (Blue Note, 2000).

Career

Hagans was born and grew up in Dayton, Ohio, United States. His early inspirations included Miles Davis, Freddie Hubbard, and Thad Jones, to whom he dedicated For the Music Suite, a 40-minute piece for jazz orchestra composed on a grant from the National Endowment for the Arts. In 1974, Hagans joined the Stan Kenton band, with whom he played until 1977, when he toured with Woody Herman. He then left for Europe, where he lived in Malmö, Sweden, a hotbed of the European jazz scene. While in Europe, he toured extensively and played with Dexter Gordon, Kenny Drew, Horace Parlan, and Thad Jones. His first recorded composition, "I Hope This Time Isn't the Last," appears on the album Thad Jones Live at Slukefter (Metronome, 1980).

In 1987, he moved to New York City. He has performed with Maria Schneider, Yellowjackets, Steps Ahead, Secret Society, and Gary Peacock. Hagans has worked extensively with producer and saxophonist Bob Belden on a variety of recordings and live performances, including their ongoing Animation/Imagination project. Festivals at which he has performed include the Mount Fuji Festival in Japan, the Montreal Jazz Festival, the Berlin Jazz Tage, and the Montreux Jazz Festival in Switzerland.

Hagans has taught master classes at universities throughout the world.

He taught at the University of Cincinnati from 1982 to 1984 and at Berklee College of Music from 1984 to 1987. From 1996 to 2010, he was Artistic Director and Composer-in-Residence for the  located in Luleå, Sweden. The Norrbotten Big Band is a 17-piece jazz orchestra for whom Hagans wrote and arranged original compositions, with guest artists including Randy Brecker, Joe Lovano, Dave Liebman, Peter Erskine, and Rufus Reid, an enterprise culminating in the Grammy Award nominated album, The Avatar Sessions: The Music of Tim Hagans, for which the Norbotten Big Band traveled to New York. His compositions are featured on numerous recordings with the Norrbotten Big Band, including Future North (Double-Time, 1998), Future Miles (ACT, 2002), and Worth the Wait (Fuzzy Music, 2007).

Hagans has been commissioned by several other European jazz orchestras, including the NDR Big Band in Hamburg, UMO in Helsinki, and he was Composer-in-Residence at the Jazz Baltica Festival in 2000. In 2008, he was awarded the ASCAP/IAJE Established Composer Award, and in 2009 he was commissioned by the Barents Composers Orchestra to write a piece for strings, woodwinds, and percussion: Daytonality, a piece based on improvisational melodic language.

Hagans is the subject of the feature documentary Boogaloo Road, directed by Runar Enberg and Marianne Soderberg. He is a featured soloist on Howard Shore's soundtrack for the feature film The Score starring Marlon Brando, Edward Norton, and Robert De Niro.

Following his interest in exploring theatrical venues for innovative jazz, he is Composer-in-Residence with the Michele Brangwen Dance Ensemble, a dance company located in Houston, Texas, and in New York City. In January 2012, his composition Outside My Window was performed with the MBDE at Dance Theatre of Harlem. He also performs with author-actor Peter Josyph in duets consisting of haiku texts and freely improvised trumpet, including Josyph's the way of the trumpet, a haiku novel written for and dedicated to Hagans.

In June 2012, Hagans was awarded an honorary doctorate from the Sibelius Academy in Helsinki.

Discography

As leader 
 From the Neck Down (MoPro, 1983)
 No Words (Blue Note, 1993)
 Audible Architecture (1994)
 Hub Songs, the Music of Freddie Hubbard (1997)
 Animation – Imagination (Blue Note, 1999)
 Re-Animation Live! with Bob Belden (Blue Note, 1999)
 Between the Lines with Marc Copland (SteepleChase, 2000)
 Future Miles (ACT, 2002)
 Beautiful Lily (Pirouet, 2006)
 Alone Together (Pirouet, 2008)
 The Avatar Sessions (2010)
 The Moon is Waiting (Palmetto, 2011)

As sideman 
With Blue Wisp Big Band
 Butterfly (Mopro, 1982)
 The Smooth One (Mopro, 1983)
 Live at Carmelo's (Mopro, 1984) – live
 Rollin' with Von Ohlen (Mopro, 1985)

With Bob Belden
 Treasure Island (Sunnyside, 1990)
 Straight to My Heart: The Music of Sting (Blue Note, 1991)
 When the Doves Cry: The Music of Prince (Blue Note, 1994)
 Bob Beldon Presents Strawberry Fields (Blue Note, 1996)
 Shades of Blue (Blue Note, 1996)
 Tapestry (Blue Note, 1997)
 Black Dahlia (Blue Note, 2001)

With Marc Copland
 Softly... (Savoy Jazz, 1998)
 Between the Lines (SteepleChase, 2000)

With John Fedchock
 New York Big Band (Reservoir, 1995) – recorded in 1992
 On the Edge (Reservoir, 1997)

With Jon Gordon
 1994: Ask Me Now (Criss Cross, 1995)
 1995: Witness (Criss Cross, 1996)

With Vic Juris
 For the Music (Jazzpoint, 1992)
 Music of Alec Wilder (Double-Time, 1996)

With Stan Kenton
 Fire Fury & Fun (Creative World, 1974)
 Journey Into Capricorn (Creative World, 1976)
 Kenton '76 (Creative World, 1976)
 Kenton Live in Europe (Decca, 1977) – live
 Street of Dreams (Creative World, 1979) – compilation
With Andy LaVerne
 Severe Clear (SteepleChase, 1990)
 Serenade to Silver (SteepleChase, 1996) – recorded in 1995

With Joe Lovano
 Worlds (Label Bleu, 1989)
 Universal Language (Blue Note, 1992)
 52nd Street Themes (Blue Note, 2000)
 Streams of Expression (Blue Note, 2006)

With Mark Masters
 The Clifford Brown Project (2003)
 Porgy and Bess: Redefined (2005)
 Wish Me Well (2006)
 Farewell Walter Dewey Redman (2008)

With Ron McClure
 Sunburst (SteepleChase, 1992)
 Concrete Canyon (SteepleChase, 1996)
 Double Triangle (Naxos Jazz, 1999)

With Bob Mintzer
 Departure (DMP, 1991) – recorded in 1990
 Only in New York (DMP, 1994) – recorded in 1993
 The First Decade (DMP, 1995)

With Maria Schneider
 1992: Evanescence (Enja, 1994)
 1995: Coming About (Enja, 1996)

With Bert Seager
 Time to Burn (Antilles, 1986)
 Because They Can (Antilles, 1987)

With Steve Slagle
 The Steve Slagle Quartet (SteepleChase, 1993)
 Spread the Word (SteepleChase, 1995)

With Ernie Wilkins
 1980: Ernie Wilkins & the Almost Big Band (Storyville, 1981)
 1981: Almost Big Band Live! At Slukefter Jazz Club In Tivoli Gardens Copenhagen (Matrix, 1982) – live
 1981: Live! At the Slukefter Jazz Club (Matrix, 1982) – live

With others
 1980 Eclipse, Thad Jones
 1986 Music for Jazz Orchestra, Orange Then Blue
 1991 Dancing Voices, Judi Silvano
 1992 Beyond Another Wall: Live in China, George Gruntz
 1992 Like a River, Yellowjackets
 1994 Gu-Ru, Kenny Werner
 1994 Until Further Notice..., Steve Rochinski
 1994 Vibe, Steps Ahead
 1994 Local Color, Jay Anderson
 1995 Passion Dance, Roseanna Vitro
 1995 Primal Blue, Kenny Burrell
 1995 Regarding the Soul, Dee Carstensen
 1995 Right as the Rain, Helen Schneider
 1995 Secrets, Joey Calderazzo
 1996 The Open Road, Don Braden
 1996 True Image, Jarmo Savolainen
 1997 Four Track Mind, Seamus Blake
 1997 Further Ado, Greg Osby
 1997 San Juan, Jim Snidero
 1997 The Gift, Gordon Brisker
 1998 Currents, Charles Pillow
 1999 Joyful Noise: A Tribute to Duke Ellington, Don Sebesky
 1999 Let's Call This That, Hal Galper
 1999 Syzygy, Jim Nolet
 1999 The Undiscovered Few, Rodney Jones
 2001 17 (Seventeen), Mark Soskin
 2003 5000 Miles, Nils Landgren
 2003 It's About Time, Charles Blenzig
 2003 Land of Shadow, Conrad Herwig
 2004 Exploration, Grachan Moncur III
 2006 Kinesthetics, Scott Kinsey
 2007 Worth the Wait, Peter Erskine
 2009 Coming Through Slaughter: The Bolden Legend, Dave Lisik Orchestra
 2010 México Azul, Magos Herrera
 2011 Agemo, Animation
 2011 Asiento, Animation

References

External links
 Official website

1954 births
Living people
Hard bop trumpeters
Mainstream jazz trumpeters
Musicians from Dayton, Ohio
Bowling Green State University alumni
Palmetto Records artists
21st-century trumpeters
Almost Big Band members
ACT Music artists
Pirouet Records artists
Blue Note Records artists